Vellereophyton is a genus of flowering plants in the family Asteraceae.

 Species
 Vellereophyton dealbatum (Thunb.) Hilliard & B.L.Burtt - Australia
 Vellereophyton felinum Hilliard - South Africa
 Vellereophyton gracillimum Hilliard - South Africa
 Vellereophyton lasianthum (Schltr. & Moeser) Hilliard - South Africa
 Vellereophyton niveum Hilliard - South Africa
 Vellereophyton pulvinatum Hilliard - South Africa
 Vellereophyton vellereum (R.A.Dyer) Hilliard - South Africa

References

Gnaphalieae
Asteraceae genera